"I Hate Everything About You" is the debut single by Canadian rock band Three Days Grace, from their debut self-titled album. The song peaked at number 55 on the Billboard Hot 100 chart, number four on the Mainstream Rock Tracks chart and number two on the Modern Rock Tracks chart. It was the 9th best performing song of the decade on the Modern Rock Tracks chart, and the 153rd best performing song of all time on the Alternative Songs chart. Despite not being one of their number one hits on any of the two charts, it is the band's longest running song on the Modern Rock chart at 45 weeks, and it also stayed 46 weeks on the Mainstream Rock chart.

Background 
Singer Adam Gontier said:

Written by Adam Gontier and produced by Gavin Brown, the theme of the song deals with love–hate relationships.

Critical reception 

Heather Phares of AllMusic called the song "one of the better alt-metal/modern rock singles in recent memory." She remarked, "At first, the song seems almost stupidly simple, both lyrically and musically. However, the controlled fury of the choruses and the ambivalent verses make the song a surprisingly smart and concise anthem for anyone stuck in a baffling relationship." She also stated, "I Hate Everything About You's frustrated explosions and passive-aggressive recriminations eerily simulate the trajectory of an ill-fated couple."

Music video 
The music video starts zoomed in towards several things, such as a TV producing static, a picture frame, and an ash tray, and then transitions towards Adam Gontier who starts singing. Soon, the video shows three teenagers going through a disastrous moment in their lives. One shows a young boy who finds his girlfriend cheating on him in the alleyway, kissing another guy. He is spying on them in his car. The second teenager is a young girl, who just broke up with her boyfriend, and the last is a boy who is being abused by his alcoholic father. Towards the end they are all seen smashing items into a hill. The young boy spying on his cheating girlfriend whips a portrait of a picture of them, smashing it to pieces. The second teenager is seen smashing her notebook of love notes and miscellaneous love items with her ex-boyfriend into the hill. The last boy, who is suffering child abuse, throws his drunken father's alcohol into the hill.

In the video, the word "hit" in "after every hit we take" is censored, due to "hit" being slang for taking drugs. The video was photographed by cinematographer Steve Gainer, and directed by Scott Winig.

Accolades 
In 2004, the song was nominated for the "Best Rock Video" and "People's Choice: Favourite Canadian Group" at the MuchMusic Video Awards and won "Producer of the Year" at the Juno Awards. In August 2007, the single won a BDS Spin Award based on the 300,000 spins it received.

Track listings

Charts

Weekly charts

Year-end charts

Decade-end charts

All-time charts

Certifications

Release history

Use in video games 
 NASCAR Thunder 2004 by EA Sports.
 Karaoke Revolution Volume 2 singalong game.
 It is playable with either a real guitar or bass guitar in Rocksmith as DLC.
 The song was made available to download on March 13, 2012, for play in Rock Band 3 Basic and PRO mode utilizing a real guitar / bass guitar, and MIDI compatible electronic drum kits / keyboards plus vocal harmonies.

References 

2003 songs
2003 debut singles
Three Days Grace songs
Jive Records singles
Song recordings produced by Gavin Brown (musician)
Songs about domestic violence
Songs written by Adam Gontier